Geezer is a slang term for a man. 
 In the UK, it is used most often to refer simply to a man, e.g. "some geezer was here earlier", and less often as a complimentary phrase, e.g. "he is a proper geezer". Sometimes females are referred to as 'Geezettes' if they share similar characteristics to a Geezer.
 In the US, the term typically refers to a cranky old man and can carry the connotation of either age or eccentricity; see fuddy-duddy. 
 
Geezer may also refer to:
 Geezer Butler, the founding bassist for Black Sabbath
 GZR, one of three different names used by Geezer Butler's heavy metal band
 Kieran McGeeney, manager of the Armagh senior football team
 Geezer (comic strip), a character in the British comic The Beezer
 3 Geezers!, a 2013 film
 Geezer (film), an American comedy-drama film
 Guizer, a performer in a traditional event such as Up Helly Aa or a Mummers Play.

See also 

 Guizer
 Geyser
 Wide boy
 Geyser (disambiguation)